Lateristachys lateralis, synonym Lycopodiella lateralis, commonly known as slender club moss, is a species of club moss native to eastern Australia and New Zealand. It grows in wet boggy habitat.

References

Lycopodiaceae
Flora of New Zealand
Flora of New South Wales
Flora of South Australia
Flora of Tasmania